String Quartet No. 4, also known by its other title Buczak, is a string quartet by the American composer Philip Glass. It was commissioned by Geoffrey Hendricks in remembrance of the artist Brian Buczak. It was premiered on July 4, 1989 at the Hauser Gallery.

Composition 
It was commissioned by Geoffrey Hendricks in remembrance of the artist Brian Buczak, who succumbed to AIDS in 1987 at the age of 33. It was premiered at a memorial service on the second anniversary of the artist's death on July 4, 1989 at the Hauser Gallery.

Glass wanted his fourth quartet to represent "a musical impression of [Buczak] as a person as well as a tribute to his life's work".

Structure 

This composition consists of three movements and takes approximately 23 minutes to perform. The movements are listed as follows:

This quartet touches on the quartet heritage of Franz Schubert and also Antonín Dvořák. The first movement begins with unison and then develops to freely interchanged melodic and rhythmic components. It heads towards an animated ending. The second movement features a lyrical and beautiful melody. The finale mixes what has been heard in the precedent movements. It builds momentum to end in a resigned and conclusive manner.

Notable recordings 
Notable recordings of this composition include:

References

External links
Archivio Conz
, Paul Klee 4 TET, 2008

String quartets by Philip Glass
1983 compositions